Hətəmlər (also, Khatamalar and Khatamlar) is a village in the Tovuz Rayon of Azerbaijan.  The village forms part of the municipality of Qəribli.

References

External links

Populated places in Tovuz District